This is an incomplete list of Acts of the Parliament of Great Britain for the years 1740–1759.  For Acts passed up until 1707 see List of Acts of the Parliament of England and List of Acts of the Parliament of Scotland.  See also the List of Acts of the Parliament of Ireland to 1700 and the List of Acts of the Parliament of Ireland, 1701–1800.

For Acts passed from 1801 onwards see List of Acts of the Parliament of the United Kingdom.  For Acts of the devolved parliaments and assemblies in the United Kingdom, see the List of Acts of the Scottish Parliament, the List of Acts of the Northern Ireland Assembly, and the List of Acts and Measures of the National Assembly for Wales; see also the List of Acts of the Parliament of Northern Ireland.

The number shown after each Act's title is its chapter number. Acts are cited using this number, preceded by the year(s) of the reign during which the relevant parliamentary session was held; thus the Union with Ireland Act 1800 is cited as "39 & 40 Geo. 3 c. 67", meaning the 67th Act passed during the session that started in the 39th year of the reign of George III and which finished in the 40th year of that reign.  Note that the modern convention is to use Arabic numerals in citations (thus "41 Geo. 3" rather than "41 Geo. III"). Acts of the last session of the Parliament of Great Britain and the first session of the Parliament of the United Kingdom are both cited as "41 Geo. 3".
Acts passed by the Parliament of Great Britain did not have a short title; however, some of these Acts have subsequently been given a short title by Acts of the Parliament of the United Kingdom (such as the Short Titles Act 1896).

Before the Acts of Parliament (Commencement) Act 1793 came into force on 8 April 1793, Acts passed by the Parliament of Great Britain were deemed to have come into effect on the first day of the session in which they were passed.  Because of this, the years given in the list below may in fact be the year before a particular Act was passed.

1740-1749

1740 (14 Geo. 2)

| {{|Bubble Schemes, Colonies Act 1740|public|37|18-11-1740|note3=|repealed=y|archived=n|}}
| {{|Caddington Church Act 1740|public|26|18-11-1740|note3=|repealed=y|archived=n|}}
| {{|Cattle Stealing Act 1740|public|6|18-11-1740|note3=|repealed=y|archived=n|}}
| {{|Cloth Manufacture Act 1740|public|35|18-11-1740|note3=|repealed=y|archived=n|}}
| {{|Common Recoveries, etc. Act 1740|public|20|18-11-1740|note3=|repealed=y|archived=n|}}
| {{|Continuance of Acts, 1740|public|34|18-11-1740|note3=|repealed=y|archived=n|}}
| {{|Delay of Cause after Issue Joined Act 1740|public|17|18-11-1740|note3=|repealed=y|archived=n|}}
| {{|Doncaster and Salter's Brook Road Act 1740|public|31|18-11-1740|note3=|repealed=y|archived=n|}}
| {{|Doncaster and Tadcaster Road Act 1740|public|28|18-11-1740|note3=|repealed=y|archived=n|}}
| {{|Ellands to Leeds Road Act 1740|public|25|18-11-1740|note3=|repealed=y|archived=n|}}
| {{|Ely Roads Act 1740|public|14|18-11-1740|note3=|repealed=y|archived=n|}}
| {{|Estates of John Coggs and John Dan Act 1740|public|30|18-11-1740|note3=|repealed=y|archived=n|}}
| {{|Exportation Act 1740|public|3|18-11-1740|note3=|repealed=y|archived=n|}}
| {{|Gainsborough Church Act 1740|public|15|18-11-1740|note3=|repealed=y|archived=n|}}
| {{|Gloucester Water Supply Act 1740|public|11|18-11-1740|note3=|repealed=y|archived=n|}}
| {{|Hertfordshire Roads Act 1740|public|13|18-11-1740|note3=|repealed=y|archived=n|}}
| {{|Importation Act 1740|public|36|18-11-1740|note3=|repealed=y|archived=n|}}
| {{|Importation into Scotland Act 1740|public|7|18-11-1740|note3=|repealed=y|archived=n|}}
| {{|Indemnity Act 1740|public|18|18-11-1740|note3=|repealed=y|archived=n|}}
| {{|Kensington, Chelsea and Fulham Roads (Toll Continuance) Act 1740|public|16|18-11-1740|note3=|repealed=y|archived=n|}}
| {{|Kent and Sussex Roads Act 1740|public|12|18-11-1740|note3=|repealed=y|archived=n|}}
| {{|Leeds and Halifax Roads Act 1740|public|32|18-11-1740|note3=|repealed=y|archived=n|}}
| {{|Licence to Joseph Porter, etc., to Import Silk Act 1740|public|4|18-11-1740|note3=|repealed=y|archived=n|}}
| {{|Longitude and Latitude Act 1740|public|39|18-11-1740|note3=|repealed=y|archived=n|}}
| {{|Mutiny Act 1740|public|9|18-11-1740|note3=|repealed=y|archived=n|}}
| {{|Navy Act 1740|public|38|18-11-1740|note3=|repealed=y|archived=n|}}
| {{|Nether Knutsford Church Act 1740|public|5|18-11-1740|note3=|repealed=y|archived=n|}}
| {{|Papists Act 1740|public|21|18-11-1740|note3=|repealed=y|archived=n|}}
| {{|Portsmouth Water Supply (Farlington) Act 1740|public|43|18-11-1740|note3=|repealed=y|archived=n|}}
| {{|Preservation of Roads Act 1740|public|42|18-11-1740|note3=|repealed=y|archived=n|}}
| {{|River Dee: Navigation Act 1740|public|8|18-11-1740|note3=|repealed=y|archived=n|}}
| {{|Saint Botolph, Aldgate Act 1740|public|27|18-11-1740|note3=|repealed=y|archived=n|}}
| {{|Salt Duties Act 1740|public|22|18-11-1740|note3=|repealed=y|archived=n|}}
| {{|Small Debts, London Act 1740|public|10|18-11-1740|note3=|repealed=y|archived=n|}}
| {{|Supply, etc. Act 1740|public|41|18-11-1740|note3=|repealed=y|archived=n|}}
| {{|Taxation Act 1740|public|1|18-11-1740|note3=|repealed=y|archived=n|}}
| {{|Taxation Act 1740|public|2|18-11-1740|note3=|repealed=y|archived=n|}}
| {{|Wakefield, etc., Roads Act 1740|public|19|18-11-1740|note3=|repealed=y|archived=n|}}
| {{|Waterbeach Level, Northampton: Drainage Act 1740|public|24|18-11-1740|note3=|repealed=y|archived=n|}}
| {{|Westminster Bridge Act 1740|public|40|18-11-1740|note3=|repealed=y|archived=n|}}
| {{|Wiltshire Roads Act 1740|public|29|18-11-1740|note3=|repealed=y|archived=n|}}
| {{|Yorkshire Roads Act 1740|public|23|18-11-1740|note3=|repealed=y|archived=n|}}
}}

1741 (15 Geo. 2)

 Bank of England Act 1741 c 13
 Buckinghamshire Roads Act 1741 c 5
 Buckinghamshire Roads Act 1741 c 6
 Byron's Shorthand Act 1741 c 23
 Cambridgeshire Roads Act 1741 c 16
 Cattle Stealing Act 1741 c 34
 Colchester (Poor Law Authority) Act 1741 c 18
 Counterfeiting Coin Act 1741 c 28
 Duties on Foreign Cambrics, etc. Act 1741 c 29
 Gloucestershire Roads Act 1741 c 15
 Gold and Silver Thread Act 1741 c 20
 Hampshire Roads Act 1741 c 14
 Herefordshire Roads Act 1741 c 17
 Highways Act 1741 c 2
 House of Commons Disqualification Act 1741 c 22
 Hull, Poor Relief Act 1741 c 10
 Indemnity Act 1741 c 21
 Justices Commitment Act 1741 c 24
 Keeping of Gunpowder Act 1741 c 32
 Kirkcaldy Beer Duties Act 1741 c 8
 Land Tax Act 1741 c 11
 Making of Sail Cloth, etc. Act 1741 c 35
 Marriage of Lunatics Act 1741 c 30
 Middlesex Roads Act 1741 c 9
 Mutiny Act 1741 c 4
 National Debt Act 1741 c 19
 Plantation Trade, etc. Act 1741 c 31
 Roads, Worcester and Warwick Act 1741 c 7
 Saint Catherine Coleman Act 1741 c 12
 Spirit Duties, etc. Act 1741 c 25
 Starr and Bent Act 1741 c 33
 Supply Act 1741 c 3
 Taxation Act 1741 c 1
 Thefts of Cloth, etc. Act 1741 c 27
 Westminster Bridge Act 1741 c 26

1742 (16 Geo. 2)

 Bankrupts Act 1742 c 27
 Bedford and Buckingham Roads Act 1742 c 4
 Bethnal Green: Parish Act 1742 c 28
 Charterhouse Square: Rates. Act 1742 c 6
 Continuance of Laws, etc. Act 1742 c 26
 Epping and Ongar Road Act 1742 c 19
 Gloucester Roads Act 1742 c 21
 Gloucester Roads Act 1742 c 22
 Hertfordshire Roads Act 1742 c 16
 Highways Act 1742 c 29
 Indemnity Act 1742 c 30
 Insolvent Debtors Relief Act 1742 c 17
 Justices Jurisdiction Act 1742 c 18
 Land Tax Act 1742 c 24
 Luton and Saint Albans Road Act 1742 c 23
 Mutiny Act 1742 c 14
 National Debt Act 1742 c 12
 National Debt Act 1742 c 13
 Papists Act 1742 c 32
 Parliamentary Elections Act 1742 c 11
 Prison (Escape) Act 1742 c 31
 Return of Offenders from Transportation Act 1742 c 15
 Saint Botolph, Aldgate: Poor Relief Act 1742 c 9
 Spirits Act 1742 c 8
 Supply, etc. Act 1742 c 25
 Taxation Act 1742 c 1
 Taxation Act 1742 c 2
 Warminster Roads Act 1742 c 5
 Warwick Roads Act 1742 c 20
 Westmorland Roads Act 1742 c 3
 Wiltshire Roads Act 1742 c 10
 Yorkshire Roads Act 1742 c 7

1743 (17 Geo. 2)

 Affidavits in County of Lancaster Act 1743 c 7
 Bedford and Hertford Roads Act 1743 c 42
 Beer Duties, Borrowstoness Act 1743 c 21
 Buckingham to Warmington Road Act 1743 c 43
 Church of Scotland, etc. Act 1743 c 11
 Coals Act 1743 c 35
 Derby Roads Act 1743 c 20
 Duties, etc. Act 1743 c 31
 Essex and Hertfordshire Roads Act 1743 c 9
 Habeas Corpus Suspension Act 1743 c 6
 Importation Act 1743 c 36
 Justices Commitment Act 1743 c 5
 Kent Roads Act 1743 c 4
 Land Drainage (Rating) Act 1743 c 37
 Linen (Trade Marks) Act 1743 c 30
 Litchfield Roads Act 1743 c 24
 London Street Lighting Act 1743 c 29
 Maidenhead Road Act 1743 c 19
 Middlesex and Hertford Roads Act 1743 c 14
 Mutiny Act 1743 c 16
 National Debt Act 1743 c 18
 Naval Prize Act 1743 c 34
 New Malton, Yorkshire (Searching, Sealing, etc., of Butter) Act 1743 c 8
 Oxford and Gloucester Roads Act 1743 c 10
 Poor Rate Act 1743 c 3
 Poor Relief Act 1743 c 38
 Recruiting Act 1743 c 15
 Recruiting Act 1743 c 26
 River Dee Navigation Act 1743 c 28
 Shoreditch Road Act 1743 c 41
 Supply, etc. Act 1743 c 17
 Supply, etc. Act 1743 c 33
 Taxation Act 1743 c 1
 Taxation Act 1743 c 2
 Treason Act 1743 c 39
 Universities (Wine Licences) Act 1743 c 40
 Warwick Roads Act 1743 c 12
 Westminster Bridge Act 1743 c 32
 Wiltshire Roads Act 1743 c 23
 Wiltshire Roads Act 1743 c 27
 Worcester Roads Act 1743 c 13
 Yorkshire Roads Act 1743 c 22
 Yorkshire Roads Act 1743 c 25

1744 (18 Geo. 2)

 Beverly Improvement Act 1744 c 13
 Boroughbridge and Darlington Road Act 1744 c 8
 Bounties on Exportation Act 1744 c 25
 Bristol Hospitals Act 1744 c 38
 Cambrics Act 1744 c 36
 Carts on Highways Act 1744 c 33
 Crown Lands - Forfeited Estates Act 1744 c 37
 Discovery of North-West Passage Act 1744 c 17
 Gaming Act 1744 c 34
 Greenwich Hospital Act 1744 c 31
 Huntingdonshire and Cambridgeshire Roads Act 1744 c 23
 Indemnity Act 1744 c 11
 Indemnity Act 1744 c 28
 Inland Duties, etc. Act 1744 c 26
 Justices Qualification Act 1744 c 20
 Kingston-upon-Hull Roads Act 1744 c 4
 Lastage and Ballastage, Thames Act 1744 c 21
 Linen (Trade Marks) Act 1744 c 24
 London Barbers and Surgeons Act 1744 c 15
 Mutiny Act 1744 c 7
 National Debt Act 1744 c 9
 Navy Act 1744 c 35
 Newbury and Marlborough Roads Act 1744 c 12
 Parliamentary Elections Act 1744 c 18
 Piracy Act 1744 c 30
 Recruiting Act 1744 c 10
 Saint Margaret's Church, King's Lynn Act 1744 c 3
 Salt Duties Act 1744 c 5
 Stamps Act 1744 c 22
 Stealing from Bleaching Grounds Act 1744 c 27
 Taxation Act 1744 c 1
 Taxation Act 1744 c 2
 Warwick Roads Act 1744 c 32
 Warwickshire Roads Act 1744 c 19
 Westminster Bridge Act 1744 c 29
 Wiltshire Road Act 1744 c 14
 Yorkshire Roads Act 1744 c 6
 Yorkshire Roads Act 1744 c 16

1745 (19 Geo. 2)

 Acts of Common Council, London Act 1745 c 8
 Attainder of Earl of Kellie and Others Act 1745 c 26
 Bank of England Act 1745 c 6
 Bankrupts Act 1745 c 32
 Bethnal Green: Completion of Church and Poor Relief Act 1745 c 15
 Coal Trade, London Act 1745 c 35
 Coinage Duties Act 1745 c 14
 Court of Session (Scotland) Act 1745 c 7
 Disarming the Highlands, etc. Act 1745 c 39 - the "Act of Proscription"
 Distemper Amongst Cattle Act 1745 c 5
 Dorchester Bridge and Causeway Act 1745 c 24
 Episcopal Meeting Houses (Scotland) Act 1745 c 38
 Gloucester Roads Act 1745 c 18
 Growth of Coffee Act 1745 c 23
 Habeas Corpus Suspension Act 1745 c 1
 Habeas Corpus Suspension Act 1745 c 17
 Harbours Act 1745 c 22
 Indemnity Act 1745 c 20
 Indemnity Act 1745 c 33
 Jurors (Scotland) Act 1745 c 9
 Lancashire Roads Act 1745 c 19
 Leicester Roads Act 1745 c 10
 Marine Insurance Act 1745 c 37
 Militia Act 1745 c 2
 Mutiny Act 1745 c 11
 National Debt Act 1745 c 12
 Naval Stores Act 1745 c 36
 Oaths of Justices of the Peace Act 1745 c 13
 Offences against Customs or Excise Act 1745 c 34
 Papists Act 1745 c 16 (An Act for allowing further Time for Inrolment of Deeds and Wills made by Papists; and for Relief of Protestant Purchasers.)
 Parliamentary Elections Act 1745 c 28
 Profane Oaths Act 1745 c 21
 Provision for the Duke of Cumberland Act 1745 c 29
 Sail Cloth Act 1745 c 27
 Sugar Trade Act 1745 c 30
 Supply, etc. Act 1745 c 31
 Suspected Persons (Scotland) Act 1745 c 25
 Taxation Act 1745 c 3
 Taxation Act 1745 c 4

1746 (20 Geo. 2)

 Aliens Act 1746 c 44
 Berkshire Roads Act 1746 c 6
 Bruntisland Beer Duties Act 1746 c 26
 Continuance of Acts, 1746 c 47
 Distemper Amongst Cattle Act 1746 c 4
 Distillers Act 1746 c 39
 Dundee Beer Duties Act 1746 c 17
 Durham to Tyne Bridge Road Act 1746 c 12
 Essex Roads Act 1746 c 7
 General Pardon Act 1746 c 52
 Gloucester and Hereford Roads Act 1746 c 31
 Gloucester Roads Act 1746 c 23
 Habeas Corpus Suspension Act 1746 c 1
 Heritable Jurisdictions (Scotland) Act 1746 c 43
 Indemnity Act 1746 c 48
 Land Tax Act 1746 c 2
 Merchant Seamen Act 1746 c 38
 Mutiny Act 1746 c 11
 National Debt Act 1746 c 3
 National Debt Act 1746 c 10
 Naval Prize Act 1746 c 24
 Northumberland Roads Act 1746 c 9
 Norwich and Thetford Road Act 1746 c 16
 Norwich Assizes Act 1746 c 21
 Prize Act 1746 c 35
 Regulation of Servants and Apprentices Act 1746 c 19
 Return of Process by Sheriffs Act 1746 c 37
 River Wear, Navigation Act 1746 c 18
 Saint Andrew, Holborn: Burial Ground Act 1746 c 33
 Saint James, Westminster: Improvement Act 1746 c 29
 Sales to the Crown Act 1746 c 51
 Southampton: Water Supply Act 1746 c 15
 Southwold Harbour Act 1746 c 14
 Stamps Act 1746 c 45
 Stockton to Barnard Castle Road Act 1746 c 25
 Sunderland to Durham Road Act 1746 c 13
 Supply, etc. Act 1746 c 36
 Taxation Act 1746 c 5
 Tenures Abolition Act 1746 c 50
 Thomas Paulin, Coal-Meter, Westminster Act 1746 c 49
 Title Deeds Lost by Rebellion in Scotland Act 1746 c 20
 Traitors Transported Act 1746 c 46
 Treason Act 1746 c 30
 University of Saint Andrews Act 1746 c 32
 Vesting Act 1747 c 41
 Wales and Berwick Act 1746 c 42
 Walton-Shepperton Bridge (Building and Tolls) Act 1746 c 22
 Warrington to Wigan Road Act 1746 c 8
 Wednesfield Chapel Act 1746 c 27
 Will of Sir Joseph Jekyll Act 1746 c 34
 Yarmouth Haven Act 1746 c 40
 Yorkshire and Durham Roads Act 1746 c 28

1747 (21 Geo. 2)

 Assurance on French Ships Act 1747 c 4
 Buckinghamshire Assizes Act 1747 c 12
 Bury Saint Edmunds (Poor Relief) Act 1747 c 21
 Cambrics Act 1747 c 26
 Cattle Theft (Scotland) Act 1747 c 34 (An Act to amend ard enforce so much of an Act made in the Nineteenth Year of His Majesty's Reign as relates to the more effectual disarming the Highlands in Scotland; . . . and for other purposes therein mentioned.) 
 Durham Roads Act 1747 c 5
 Durham Roads Act 1747 c 27
 Exportation, etc. Act 1747 c 14
 Fen Drainage Act 1747 c 18
 Highways Act 1747 c 28
 Importation of Indigo Act 1747 c 30
 Indemnity Act 1747 c 9
 Insolvent Debtors Relief Act 1747 c 31
 Insolvent Debtors Relief, etc. Act 1747 c 33
 Lancashire Roads Act 1747 c 15
 Land Tax Act 1747 c 7
 Liverpool, Improvement Act 1747 c 24
 Mercers, London Act 1747 c 32
 Mutiny Act 1747 c 6
 Mutiny Act 1747 c 13
 National Debt Act 1747 c 2
 Navy Act 1747 c 11
 Orphans, London Act 1747 c 29
 Roads, Bromsgrove to Birmingham Act 1747 c 22
 Roads, Warwick, Stafford and Worcester Act 1747 c 20
 Sheriffs (Scotland) Act 1747 c 19
 Southampton Roads Act 1747 c 16
 Supply, etc. Act 1747 c 23
 Taxation Act 1747 c 1
 Title Deeds Lost by Rebellion in Scotland Act 1747 c 17
 Vexatious Arrests Act 1747 c 3
 Water Supply, East London Act 1747 c 8
 Window Duties Act 1747 c 10
 Wolverhampton Roads Act 1747 c 25

1748 (22 Geo. 2)

 Anstruther Easter Beer Duties Act 1748 c 10
 Argyllshire Valuation Act 1748 c 29
 Bristol, Paving, etc. Act 1748 c 20
 Bristol Roads Act 1748 c 28
 Buxton to Manchester Road Act 1748 c 12
 Church of Scotland, etc. Act 1748 c 21
 Continuance of Laws, etc. Act 1748 c 46
 Crown Lands - Forfeited Estates Act 1748 c 52
 Denver, etc. (Norfolk and Cambridge) Drainage Act 1748 c 16
 Discharged Soldiers, etc. Act 1748 c 44
 Fish Market, Westminster Act 1748 c 49
 Frauds by Workmen Act 1748 c 27
 Hereford Roads Act 1748 c 15
 Hereford Roads Act 1748 c 18
 Hereford Roads Act 1748 c 26
 Hue and Cry Act 1748 c 24
 Importation Act 1748 c 36
 Isle of Ely, Drainage Act 1748 c 11
 Isle of Ely, Drainage Act 1748 c 19
 Isle of Ely Roads Act 1748 c 34
 Keeping, etc., of Gunpowder Act 1748 c 38
 Kent Roads Act 1748 c 4
 Kent Roads Act 1748 c 8
 Kinghorn Beer Duties Act 1748 c 13
 Land Tax Act 1748 c 41
 Maryport Harbour Act 1748 c 6
 Middlesex and Hertfordshire Roads Act 1748 c 14
 Mutiny Act 1748 c 5
 National Debt Act 1748 c 23
 Navy Act 1748 c 33
 Northamptonshire Roads Act 1748 c 17
 Northumberland Roads Act 1748 c 7
 Northumberland Roads Act 1748 c 9
 Post Office Act 1748 c 25
 Prize Causes Act 1748 c 3
 Ramsgate and Sandwich Harbours Act 1748 c 40
 Settlement of Moravians in America Act 1748 c 30
 Shoreditch: Lighting and Watching Act 1748 c 50
 Small Debts, Southwark, etc. Act 1748 c 47
 Southwark Roads Act 1748 c 31
 Stockton to Barnard Castle Road Act 1748 c 51
 Supply, etc. Act 1748 c 42
 Surrey and Sussex Roads Act 1748 c 35
 Taxation Act 1748 c 1
 Taxation Act 1748 c 2
 Taxation Act 1748 c 37
 Treason Outlawries (Scotland) Act 1748 c 48
 Weymouth Harbour Act 1748 c 22
 Whale Fishery Act 1748 c 45
 Worcestershire Roads Act 1748 c 43
 Yorkshire and Durham Roads Act 1748 c 32
 Yorkshire Roads Act 1748 c 39

1749 (23 Geo. 2)

 Artificers, etc. Act 1749 c 13
 Clerk of the Hanaper Act 1749 c 25
 Continuance of Acts, etc., 1749 c 26
 Cumberland Roads Act 1749 c 40
 Distemper Amongst Cattle Act 1749 c 23
 Fulham Roads Act 1749 c 10
 Gloucester Streets Act 1749 c 15
 Great Yarmouth Haven Act 1749 c 6
 Growth of Raw Silk Act 1749 c 20
 Haddington County Roads Act 1749 c 17
 Hampton Court Bridge Act 1749 c 37
 Herring Fishery Act 1749 c 24
 Importation, etc. Act 1749 c 29
 Importation of Raw Silk Act 1749 c 34
 Lancashire Roads Act 1749 c 7
 Manchester Roads Act 1749 c 5
 Mutiny Act 1749 c 4
 National Debt Act 1749 c 16
 National Debt (No. 1) Act 1749 c 1
 National Debt (No. 2) Act 1749 c 22
 Northamptonshire Roads Act 1749 c 8
 Prosecutions for Perjury Act 1749 c 11
 Rectory of Saint George, Southwark Act 1749 c 36
 River Colne Navigation Act 1749 c 19
 River Lune Navigation Act 1749 c 12. (An Act for improving the Navigation of the River Loyne, otherwise called Lune; and for building a Quay or wharf near the Town of Lancaster in the County Palatine of Lancaster).
 Sail Cloth Act 1749 c 32
 Saint Martin's in the Fields (Poor Relief) Act 1749 c 35
 Small Debts, Middlesex Act 1749 c 33
 Small Debts, Tower Hamlets Act 1749 c 30
 Small Debts, Westminster Act 1749 c 27
 Southwark Streets Act 1749 c 18
 Supply, etc. Act 1749 c 21
 Taxation Act 1749 c 2
 Taxation Act 1749 c 3
 Taxation Act 1749 c 9
 Trade to Africa Act 1749 c 31
 Uniformity of Worship Act 1749 c 28
 Westminster Market Act 1749 c 14
 Whitby Harbour Act 1749 c 39
 York and Boroughbridge Road Act 1749 c 38

1750-1759

1750 (24 Geo. 2)

 African Company Act 1750 c 49
 Apprehension of Endorsed Warrants Act 1750 c 55
 Bank of England Act 1750 c 4
 Beaconsfield and Redhill Road Act 1750 c 32
 Bounty on Corn, etc. Act 1750 c 56
 Brandon and Waveney: Navigation Act 1750 c 12
 Bristol Churches Act 1750 c 37
 Calendar (New Style) Act 1750 c 23
 Carlisle and Newcastle Road Act 1750 c 25
 Constables Protection Act 1750 c 44
 Continuance of Acts, 1750 c 52
 Continuance of Acts, 1750 c 57
 Distemper Among Cattle Act 1750 c 54
 Duchy of Cornwall Act 1750 c 50
 Durham Roads Act 1750 c 30
 Edinburgh and Leith Road Act 1750 c 35
 Fishhouse Bridge, Lancashire Act 1750 c 36
 Game (Scotland) Act 1750 c 34
 Gloucester and Oxford Road Act 1750 c 28
 Golden Square (Rates) Act 1750 c 27
 Greenock Beer Duties Act 1750 c 38
 Hertfordshire and Middlesex Roads Act 1750 c 10
 Highways Act 1750 c 43
 Huntingdonshire and Northamptonshire Roads Act 1750 c 59
 Indemnity Act 1750 c 5
 Islington Church Act 1750 c 15
 Juries, etc. Act 1750 c 18
 Lancashire Roads Act 1750 c 13
 Lancaster Roads Act 1750 c 20
 Land Tax Act 1750 c 7
 Lawton and Cranage Road Act 1750 c 33
 Linen and Hemp Manufactures Act 1750 c 31
 London and Mercers Company Act 1750 c 14
 Ludlow and Monk's Bridge Road Act 1750 c 29
 Michaelmas Term Act 1750 c 48
 Minority of Successor to Crown Act 1751 c 24. Also called the Minority of Successor to Crown Act 1750. (An Act to provide for the Administration of the Government, in case the Crown should descend to any of the Children of his late Royal Highness Frederick Prince of Wales, being under the Age of eighteen Years; and for the Care and Guardianship of their Persons.)
 Mutiny Act 1750 c 6
 Nar: Navigation Act 1750 c 19
 National Debt Act 1750 c 2
 National Debt Act 1750 c 11
 Oxford Roads Act 1750 c 21
 Paper Bills of Credit, American Colonies Act 1750 c 53, also known as the Currency Act of 1751
 Pot and Pearl Ashes Act 1750 c 51
 Richmond and Lancaster Road Act 1750 c 17
 River Avon: Navigation Act 1750 c 39
 Roads in Lincoln Act 1750 c 3
 Robberies on Rivers, etc. Act 1750 c 45
 Saint Matthew, Bethnal Green (Paving, etc.) Act 1750 c 26
 Sale of Spirits Act 1750 c 40 also known as the "Gin Act"
 Small Debts, Lincoln Act 1750 c 16
 Small Debts, Westminster Act 1750 c 42
 Southwark Roads Act 1750 c 58
 Supply, etc. Act 1750 c 47
 Tadcaster, etc., Roads Act 1750 c 22
 Taxation Act 1750 c 1
 Taxation Act 1750 c 46
 Thames and Isis: Navigation Act 1750 c 8
 Tobacco Duties Act 1750 c 41
 Wiltshire Roads Act 1750 c 9

1751 (25 Geo. 2)

 Admission of Vassals (Scotland) Act 1751 c 20
 African Company Act 1751 c 40
 Berkshire Roads Act 1751 c 21
 British Subjects Act 1751 c 39
 Calendar Act 1751 c 30
 Coroners Act 1751 c 29
 Crown Lands - Forfeited Estates Act 1751 c 41
 Disorderly Houses Act 1751 c 36
 Distemper Amongst Cattle Act 1751 c 31
 East Greenwich Church: Burial Act 1751 c 11
 Edinburgh Beer Duties Act 1751 c 9
 Gloucester Roads Act 1751 c 13
 Greenwich Hospital Act 1751 c 42
 Growth of Coffee, etc. Act 1751 c 35
 Hereford Roads Act 1751 c 56
 Importation Act 1751 c 14
 Importation Act 1751 c 19
 Importation, etc. Act 1751 c 32
 Indemnity Act 1751 c 15
 Insurances on Foreign Ships Act 1751 c 26
 Kent Roads Act 1751 c 8
 Land Tax Act 1751 c 3
 Leeds and Halifax Roads Act 1751 c 55
 Market Harborough and Brampton Roads Act 1751 c 57
 Mercers Company, London Act 1751 c 7
 Middlesex (Registry of Deeds) Act 1751 c 4
 Morpeth and Elsdon Road Act 1751 c 33
 Murder Act 1751 c 37
 Mutiny Act 1751 c 2
 National Debt Act 1751 c 25
 National Debt Act 1751 c 27
 Northumberland Roads Act 1751 c 18
 Northumberland Roads Act 1751 c 46 
 Northumberland Roads Act 1751 c 48
 Post Roads in Scotland Act 1751 c 28
 Saint Margaret and Saint John the Evangelist, Westminster (Poor Relief, etc.) Act 1751 c 23
 Scarborough Harbour Act 1751 c 44
 Shrewsbury and Wrexham Road Act 1751 c 22
 Shropshire Roads Act 1751 c 49
 Small Debts, Birmingham Act 1751 c 34
 Small Debts, Canterbury Act 1751 c 45
 Small Debts, Liverpool Act 1751 c 43
 Small Debts, Saint Albans Act 1751 c 38
 South London Roads Act 1751 c 51
 Staffordshire Roads Act 1751 c 16
 Stealing from Blacklead Mines Act 1751 c 10
 Sussex Roads Act 1751 c 50
 Taunton Roads Act 1751 c 54
 Taxation Act 1751 c 1
 Wills Act 1751 c 6
 Wiltshire and Gloucester Roads Act 1751 c 59
 Wiltshire and Somerset Roads Act 1751 c 17
 Wiltshire and Somerset Roads Act 1751 c 24
 Wiltshire and Somerset Roads Act 1751 c 52
 Wiltshire Roads Act 1751 c 5
 Wiltshire Roads Act 1751 c 12
 Worcestershire Roads Act 1751 c 60
 Yorkshire Roads Act 1751 c 47
 Yorkshire Roads Act 1751 c 53
 Yorkshire Roads Act 1751 c 58

1753 (26 Geo. 2)

 Alehouses Act 1753 c 31
 Bedfordshire Roads Act 1753 c 41
 Berwick Roads Act 1753 c 82
 Bewdley Roads Act 1753 c 39
 Bradford and Wakefield Road Act 1753 c 83
 Bridlington Piers Act 1753 c 10
 British Museum Act 1753 c 22
 Burton-upon-Trent and Derby Road Act 1753 c 59
 Buxton and Manchester Road Act 1753 c 53
 Carlisle and Eamont Bridge Road Act 1753 c 40
 Cattle Distemper, Vagrancy, Marshalsea Prison, etc. Act 1753 c 34
 Cheshire Roads Act 1753 c 62
 Chester Roads Act 1753 c 84
 Chichester: Poor Relief Act 1753 c 99
 Christchurch, Stepney: Poor Relief Act 1753 c 98
 Clandestine Marriages Act 1753 c 33
 Continuance of Acts, etc., 1753 c 32
 Cumberland Roads Act 1753 c 37
 Cumberland Roads Act 1753 c 49
 Customs Act 1753 c 12
 Debtors' Prison, Devonshire Act 1753 c 57
 Disarming of the Highlands, etc. Act 1753 c 29
 Discovery of Longitude at Sea Act 1753 c 25
 Drayton and Edgehill Road Act 1753 c 78
 Durham and Tyne Bridge Road Act 1753 c 48
 Dysart Beer Duties Act 1753 c 44
 East Greenwich: Poor Relief, etc. Act 1753 c 100
 Edinburgh Buildings Act 1753 c 36
 Elland and Leeds Road Act 1753 c 61
 Exeter Roads Act 1753 c 74
 Exportation Act 1753 c 11
 Exportation Act 1753 c 15
 Ferrybridge and Boroughbridge Road Act 1753 c 77
 Flimwell and Hastings Road Act 1753 c 54
 Game Act 1753 c 2
 Glasgow and Shotts Road Act 1753 c 81
 Glasgow Roads Act 1753 c 90
 Hagley and Birmingham Road Act 1753 c 47
 Hampstead Roads Act 1753 c 80
 Herring Fishery Act 1753 c 9
 Hertford and Ware Roads Act 1753 c 56
 Highways Act 1753 c 28
 Highways and Turnpike Roads Act 1753 c 30
 Importation Act 1753 c 8
 Justices Act 1753 c 27
 Justices' Clerks' Fees Act 1753 c 14
 Kent Roads Act 1753 c 68
 Lancashire Roads Act 1753 c 63
 Lancashire Roads Act 1753 c 65
 Lancaster and Westmorland Roads Act 1753 c 52
 Land Tax Act 1753 c 4
 Leicester Roads Act 1753 c 46
 Leicester and Stafford Roads Act 1753 c 85
 Levant Trade Act 1753 c 18
 Linen Manufacture (Scotland) Act 1753 c 20
 Manchester Church Act 1753 c 45
 Mutiny Act 1753 c 5
 National Debt Act 1753 c 1
 National Debt Act 1753 c 23
 Naturalization of Jews Act 1753 c 26
 Northampton Roads Act 1753 c 88
 Old Street Road Act 1753 c 87
 Oxford and Gloucester Roads Act 1753 c 70
 Paddington Churchyard Act 1753 c 43
 Paisley Beer Duties Act 1753 c 96
 Papists Act 1753 c 24
 Peebles Road Act 1753 c 93
 Perth Roads Act 1753 c 91
 Portsea Common Chapel Act 1753 c 58
 Prestonpans Beer Duties Act 1753 c 79
 Quarantine Act 1753 c 6
 River Dee: Navigation Act 1753 c 35
 Saint Botolph Church, Aldersgate Act 1753 c 94
 Saint George's Hanover Square (Poor Relief) Act 1753 c 97
 Salt Duties Act 1753 c 3
 Shoreditch Road Act 1753 c 55
 Silk Manufactures Act 1753 c 21
 Small Debts, Boston Act 1753 c 7
 Somerset Roads Act 1753 c 69
 Somerset Roads Act 1753 c 71
 Somerset Roads Act 1753 c 92
 South Sea Company Act 1753 c 16
 Stealing Shipwrecked Goods Act 1753 c 19
 Stockton and Barnard Castle Road Act 1753 c 89
 Stone Church, Stafford. Act 1753 c 38
 Suffolk Roads Act 1753 c 72
 Surrey and Southampton Roads Act 1753 c 51
 Tadcaster and Otley Road Act 1753 c 64
 Thirsk Roads Act 1753 c 75
 Tobacco Trade, etc. Act 1753 c 13
 Warwick Roads Act 1753 c 73
 Wells Roads Act 1753 c 76
 Westminster, King's Street Act 1753 c 101
 Westmorland Roads Act 1753 c 67
 Wiltshire and Southampton Roads Act 1753 c 66
 Wiltshire, Dorset and Somerset Roads Act 1753 c 60
 Wiltshire Roads Act 1753 c 42
 Window Duties Act 1753 c 17
 Worcester Roads Act 1753 c 50
 York and Durham Roads Act 1753 c 95
 Yorkshire and Westmorland Roads Act 1753 c 86

1754

27 Geo. 2

Public Acts

 Alloa Beer Duties Act 1754 c 35
 Axminster Roads Act 1754 c 32
 Bedford and Buckinghamshire Roads Act 1754 c 21
 Bedford and Buckinghamshire Roads Act 1754 c 34
 Bedford and Northamptonshire Roads Act 1754 c 33
 Bedford Level Act 1754 c 19
 Bridgeford Lane, Nottinghamshire to Kettering Road Act 1754 c 39
 Coinage Duties, etc. Act 1754 c 11
 Continuance of Acts, etc., 1754 c 18
 Distemper Amongst Cattle Act 1754 c 14
 Distresses Under Justices' Warrants Act 1754 c 20
 Durham Roads Act 1754 c 29
 Frauds in Manufacture of Clocks, etc. Act 1754 c 7
 Glasgow Roads Act 1754 c 27
 Indemnity Act 1754 c 13
 Justices' Clerks' Fees (Middlesex) Act 1754 c 16
 Kent Roads Act 1754 c 26
 Kettering and Newport Pagnell Road Act 1754 c 31
 King's Bench Prison Act 1754 c 17
 Lancaster and Yorkshire Roads Act 1754 c 37
 Land Tax Act 1754 c 4
 Leicester to Peterborough Road Act 1754 c 30
 Leicester and Warwick Roads Act 1754 c 42
 Leith Harbour Act 1754 c 8
 Market Harborough and Brampton Road Act 1754 c 28
 Mutiny Act 1754 c 5
 Mutiny, East Indies Act 1754 c 9
 Naturalization of Jews Act 1754 c 1
 Navigation, Norfolk Act 1754 c 12
 Northamptonshire Roads Act 1754 c 23
 Nottinghamshire and Leicester Roads Act 1754 c 22
 Offenders (Conveyance) Act 1754 c 3
 Persons Going Armed and Disguised Act 1754 c 15
 Ratcliff Highway Act 1754 c 40
 Saint Luke's Middlesex (Lighting and Watching) Act 1754 c 25
 Saint Nicholas and Saint Paul, Deptford (Poor Relief, etc.) Act 1754 c 38
 Stannaries (Servants and Apprentices) Act 1754 c 6
 Supply, etc. Act 1754 c 10
 Sussex Roads Act 1754 c 24
 Taxation Act 1754 c 2
 Truro Roads Act 1754 c 41
 Warwick and Worcester Roads Act 1754 c 36

Private Acts

27 & 28 Geo. 2

Private Acts

 Naturalization of Peter Michael Morin. c 1

1755 (28 Geo. 2)

 Bristol (Nightly Watch) Act 1755 c 32
 Bury and Stratton Road Act 1755 c 35
 Cambridge Roads Act 1755 c 36
 Chelsea Hospital Act 1755 c 1
 Dean's Yard, Westminster Act 1755 c 54
 Devon Roads Act 1755 c 49
 Distemper Amongst Cattle Act 1755 c 18
 Edinburgh Roads Act 1755 c 39
 Game Act 1755 c 12
 Glasgow Beer Duties Act 1755 c 29
 Gloucester and Warwick Roads Act 1755 c 47
 Herring Fishery Act 1755 c 14
 Highways and Turnpike Roads Act 1755 c 17
 Holy Trinity, Guildford Act 1755 c 56
 Huntingdon Roads Act 1755 c 26
 Idemnity Act 1755 c 3
 Indemnity Act 1755 c 24
 Importation Act 1755 c 21
 Insolvent Debtors Relief Act 1755 c 13
 Kimbolton Road Act 1755 c 33
 Kingston-upon-Hull: Improvement Act 1755 c 27
 Lancashire Roads Act 1755 c 58
 Land Tax Act 1755 c 5
 Launceston: Poor Relief Act 1755 c 38
 Leeds: Lighting, etc. Act 1755 c 41
 Litchfield and Chester Roads Act 1755 c 52
 Making of Indigo Act 1755 c 25
 Marine Mutiny Act 1755 c 11
 Market Harborough to Coventry Road Act 1755 c 40
 Monmouth Roads Act 1755 c 31
 Mortuaries (Chester) Act 1755 c 6
 Mutiny Act 1755 c 4
 National Debt Act 1755 c 15
 Navigation Act 1755 c 16
 Oxford and Buckinghamshire Roads Act 1755 c 42
 Papists Act 1755 c 10
 Rochdale to Burnley Road Act 1755 c 53
 Rotherhithe Ferry Act 1755 c 43
 Saint Bartholomew the Great Parish, London (Improvement) Act 1755 c 37
 Sandwich Bridge Act 1755 c 55
 Sankey Brook: Navigation Act 1755 c 8
 Sheriffs (Scotland) Act 1755 c 7
 Southwark Market Act 1755 c 9
 Southwark Market Act 1755 c 23
 Stevenage and Biggleswade Road Act 1755 c 30
 Supply, etc. Act 1755 c 22
 Surrey Roads Act 1755 c 57
 Sussex and Surrey Roads Act 1755 c 45
 Sutton and Reigate Road Act 1755 c 28
 Taxation Act 1755 c 2
 Thefts, Robberies, etc. Act 1755 c 19
 Warwick and Oxford Roads Act 1755 c 46
 Whale Fishery Act 1755 c 20
 Wiltshire Roads Act 1755 c 44
 Wolverhampton Chapel Act 1755 c 34
 Worcestershire Roads Act 1755 c 48
 Yorkshire and Durham Roads Act 1755 c 51
 Yorkshire and Lancaster Roads Act 1755 c 59
 Yorkshire and Lancaster Roads Act 1755 c 60
 Yorkshire Roads Act 1755 c 50

1756 (29 Geo. 2)

 Alehouses Act 1756 c 12
 Bedford Level Act 1756 c 9
 Berkshire Roads Act 1756 c 77
 Berkshire Roads Act 1756 c 81
 Bethnal Green Road Act 1756 c 43
 Blackfriars Bridge Act 1756 c 86
 Bristol Watch Act 1756 c 47
 Bruton Roads Act 1756 c 50
 Carlford, Suffolk: Poor Relief Act 1756 c 79
 Church of Saint John, Wapping Act 1756 c 89
 Commissions to Foreign Protestants Act 1756 c 5
 Continuance of Acts, 1756 c 28
 Court Baron, Sheffield Act 1756 c 37
 Denbigh Roads Act 1756 c 68
 Derby and Sheffield Roads Act 1756 c 82
 Derby Gaol Act 1756 c 48
 Durham Roads Act 1756 c 70
 Edinburgh Water Act 1756 c 74
 Exeter Roads Act 1756 c 55
 Exportation Act 1756 c 15
 Exportation Act 1756 c 16
 Fish Act 1756 c 39
 Fisheries (Scotland) Act 1756 c 23
 Foreign Enlistment Act 1756 c 17
 Gloucester Roads Act 1756 c 58
 Gloucester and Wiltshire Roads Act 1756 c 56
 Gloucestershire Roads Act 1756 c 51
 Hay Bridge Over Wye Act 1756 c 73
 Hereford Roads Act 1756 c 65
 Highgate and Hampstead Roads Act 1756 c 88
 Hinckley and Coventry Road Act 1756 c 66
 Hundred Foot River and Ouse: Bedford Level Act 1756 c 22
 Inclosure Act 1756 c. 36
 Indemnity Act 1756 c 32
 Infants, Lunatics, etc. Act 1756 c 31
 Insolvent Debtors Relief Act 1756 c 18
 Isle of Ely: Drainage Act 1756 c 21
 Isle of Portland Church Act 1756 c 75
 Juries Act 1756 c 19
 Lincoln and Peterborough Roads Act 1756 c 85
 Lincoln Roads Act 1756 c 84
 Little Cumbrae Lighthouse Act 1756 c 20
 London Bridge Act 1756 c 40
 Ludlow Roads Act 1756 c 59
 Marine Mutiny Act 1756 c 6
 Maryport Harbour Act 1756 c 57
 Much Wenlock Roads Act 1756 c 60
 Mutiny Act 1756 c 3
 National Debt Act 1756 c 7
 Naval Prize, etc. Act 1756 c 34
 Navigation Act 1756 c 11
 Navy Act 1756 c 27
 Northamptonshire and Lincoln Roads Act 1756 c 76
 Old Street Road Act 1756 c 44
 Poole Harbour Act 1756 c 10
 Poole Roads Act 1756 c 52
 Presteigne Road Act 1756 c 94
 Quarantine Act 1756 c 8
 Recruiting Act 1756 c 4
 Recruiting, etc., America Act 1756 c 35
 River Nene: Navigation Act 1756 c 69
 Saint Mary Abbotts, Kensington (Poor Relief) Act 1756 c 63
 Saint Mary, Newington Butts, Churchyard Act 1756 c 42
 Saint Marylebone Watch Act 1756 c 53
 Saint Peter's Westminster Act 1756 c 62
 Shoreditch to Stamford Hill Road Act 1756 c 41
 Shrewsbury and Wrexham Road Act 1756 c 93
 Shrewsbury Improvement Act 1756 c 78
 Shropshire Roads Act 1756 c 61
 Shropshire Roads Act 1756 c 64
 Stealing of Lead, etc. Act 1756 c 30
 Stockbridge Roads Act 1756 c 46
 Sugar Colonies, etc. Act 1756 c 26
 Supply Act 1756 c 24
 Supply, etc. Act 1756 c 29
 Taxation Act 1756 c 1
 Taxation Act 1756 c 2
 Taxation Act 1756 c 13
 Taxation Act 1756 c 14
 Tower of London Act 1756 c 87
 Truro Roads Act 1756 c 72
 Westminster Act 1756 c 25
 Westminster Bridge Act 1756 c 38
 Wiltshire and Dorset Roads Act 1756 c 54
 Wiltshire and Southampton Roads Act 1756 c 45
 Wiltshire, Dorset and Somerset Roads Act 1756 c 92
 Wiltshire Road Act 1756 c 67
 Wincanton Roads Act 1756 c 49
 Woollen Manufacture Act 1756 c 33
 York Buildings: Rates Act 1756 c 90
 Yorkshire and Durham Roads Act 1756 c 80
 Yorkshire and Lancaster Roads Act 1756 c 91
 Yorkshire Roads Act 1756 c 71
 Yorkshire Roads Act 1756 c 83

1757

30 Geo. 2
 Ayr Roads Act 1757 c 57
 Bath Roads Act 1757 c 67
 Bath (Streets, Buildings, Watch, etc.) Act 1757 c 65
 Brandon and Sams Cut Drain: Drainage Act 1757 c 35
 Denbigh and Carnarvon Roads Act 1757 c 69
 Discontinuance of Duties Act 1757 c 7
 Discontinuance of Duties Act 1757 c 14
 Distillation Act 1757 c 10
 Distillation Act 1757 c 15
 Distemper Amongst Cattle Act 1757 c 20
 Enlargement of Times for Executing Acts, 1757 c 37
 Exportation Act 1757 c 1
 Exportation Act 1757 c 9
 Frome Roads Act 1757 c 39
 Guildford and Arundel Road Act 1757 c 60
 Herring Fishery Act 1757 c 30
 Hertford and Bedford Roads Act 1757 c 43
 Hertford and Broadwater Road Act 1757 c 45
 Highways and Turnpike Roads Act 1757 c 27
 Highways and Turnpike Roads Act 1757 c 28
 Huntingdonshire Roads Act 1757 c 51
 Importation Act 1757 c 16
 Importation Act 1757 c 17
 Indemnity Act 1757 c 29
 Isle of Ely: Drainage Act 1757 c 33
 Leicester Roads Act 1757 c 44
 Leicestershire Roads Act 1757 c 49
 Lincoln and Northampton Roads Act 1757 c 68
 March, Cambridge, Isle of Ely: Drainage Act 1757 c 36
 Marine Mutiny Act 1757 c 11
 Medway Fisheries Act 1757 c 21
 Militia Act 1757 c 25
 Mutiny Act 1757 c 6
 National Debt Act 1757 c 19
 Northumberland Roads Act 1757 c 52
 Obtaining Money by False Pretences, etc. Act 1757 c 24
 Old Brentford Bridge Act 1757 c 63
 Oxfordshire Roads Act 1757 c 48
 Poole Roads Act 1757 c 66
 Preston Bridge Act 1757 c 55
 Prize Goods Act 1757 c 18
 Public Lottery Act 1757 c 5
 Quartering of Foreign Troops Act 1757 c 2
 Reading and Basingstoke Road Act 1757 c 53
 Recruiting Act 1757 c 8
 Recruiting Act 1757 c 13
 River Blyth: Navigation Act 1757 c 47
 River Ivel: Navigation Act 1757 c 62
 River Lea Bridge and Roads Act 1757 c 59
 Saint Luke, Middlesex (Poor Relief) Act 1757 c 42
 Somerset and Wiltshire Roads Act 1757 c 40
 Southwark Market Act 1757 c 31
 Southwold: Improvement Act 1757 c 58
 Supply, etc. Act 1757 c 23
 Supply, etc. Act 1757 c 26
 Surrey and Southampton Roads Act 1757 c 61
 Surrey and Sussex Roads Act 1757 c 50
 Taxation Act 1757 c 3
 Taxation Act 1757 c 4
 Tenbury Roads Act 1757 c 38
 Traffic on Highways Act 1757 c 22
 Warwick Shire Hall Act 1757 c 56
 Westminster Bridge Act 1757 c 34
 Wiggenhall Drainage Act 1757 c 32
 Wiltshire and Somerset Roads Act 1757 c 46
 Wiltshire Roads Act 1757 c 41
 Woollen Manufactures Act 1757 c 12
 Worcester, Warwick and Gloucester Roads Act 1757 c 64
 Yorkshire Roads Act 1757 c 54

31 Geo. 2
 Allowing Time for First Meetings Act 1757 c 13
 Apprentices (Settlement) Act 1757 c 11
 Bedford Level: Drainage Act 1757 c 18
 Brixton: Small Debts Act 1757 c 23
 Continuance of Acts, etc., 1757 c 1
 Continuance of Acts, etc., 1757 c 35
 Continuance, etc., of Acts, 1757 c 42
 Crown Lands, Forfeited Estates Act 1757 c 16
 Dover Harbour Act 1757 c 8
 Enlargement of Time for First Meetings Act 1757 c 34
 Exportation Act 1757 c 15
 Exportation Act 1757 c 37
 Fortifications Act 1757 c 38
 Fortifications Act 1757 c 39
 Importation Act 1757 c 3
 Importation Act 1757 c 28
 Inclosure Act 1757 c 41
 Indemnity Act 1757 c 9
 Insurances on Foreign Ships Act 1757 c 27
 Isle of Ely: Drainage Act 1757 c 19
 Land Tax Act 1757 c 4
 Land Tax Act 1757 c 7
 London Bridge Act 1757 c 20
 Madder Act 1757 c 12
 Making of Bread Act 1757 c 29
 Marine Mutiny Act 1757 c 6
 Militia Act 1757 c 26
 Militia Pay Act 1757 c 30
 Mutiny Act 1757 c 5
 Navy Act 1757 c 10
 Oxfordshire Roads Act 1757 c 46
 Papists Act 1757 c 21
 Parliamentary Elections Act 1757 c 14
 Passage from Charing Cross Act 1757 c 36
 Pension Duties Act 1757 c 22
 Plate (Duty on Dealer's Licence) Act 1757 c 32
 Sale of Hay and Straw and of Cattle, London Act 1757 c 40
 Supply, etc. Act 1757 c 31
 Supply, etc. Act 1757 c 33
 Taxation Act 1757 c 2
 Westminster Act 1757 c 17
 Westminster Corn and Grain Market Act 1757 c 25
 Yarmouth: Small Debts Act 1757 c 24

1758 (32 Geo. 2)

 Coal Trade, London Act 1758 c 27
 Continuance of Acts, 1758 c 23
 Debtors Imprisonment Act 1758 c 28
 Discontinuance of Duties Act 1758 c 12
 Excise Act 1758 c 29
 Exportation etc. Act 1758 c 2
 Exportation Act 1758 c 8
 Fen Drainage Act 1758 c 13
 Important Act 1758 c 32
 Importation Act 1758 c 1
 Importation Act 1758 c 11
 Importation Act 1758 c 34
 Indemnity Act 1758 c 7
 Marine Mutiny Act 1758 c 9
 Milford Fortifications Act 1758 c 26
 Militia Act 1758 c 20
 Militia Pay Act 1758 c 21
 Mutiny Act 1758 c 5
 National Debt Act 1758 c 10
 National Debt Act 1758 c 22
 Naval Prize Act 1758 c 25
 Offences Against Excise Laws Act 1758 c 17
 Pension Duties Act 1758 c 33
 Persons Going Armed or Disguised Act 1758 c 18
 Plate (Duty on Dealer's Licence) Act 1758 c 24
 Plymouth and Portsmouth Fortifications Act 1758 c 30
 Post Fines Act 1758 c 14
 Salaries of Judges Act 1758 c 35
 Small Debts, Southwark, etc. Act 1758 c 6
 Supply, etc. Act 1758 c 31
 Supply, etc. Act 1758 c 36
 Taxation Act 1758 c 3
 Taxation Act 1758 c 4
 Thames, etc. Act 1758 c 16
 Turnpike Roads (Scotland) Act 1758 c 15
 Wine Licences Act 1758 c 19

1759 (33 Geo. 2)

 Continuance of Acts, 1759 c 16
 Courts Baron of High Peak and Castleton Act 1759 c 31
 Distillation Act 1759 c 9
 Duchy of Cornwall Act 1759 c 10
 Enlargement of Time for First Meetings Act 1759 c 14
 Exportation Act 1759 c 15
 Exportation Act 1759 c 28
 Fish Act 1759 c 27
 Hackney Chairs, etc. Act 1759 c 25
 Importation Act 1759 c 4
 Importation Act 1759 c 5
 Indemnity Act 1759 c 29
 Isle of Ely, Suffolk, Norfolk Drainage Act 1759 c 32
 London Streets, City Act 1759 c 30
 Malt Duties, etc. Act 1759 c 7
 Marine Mutiny Act 1759 c 8
 Militia Act 1759 c 2
 Militia Act 1759 c 22
 Militia Pay Act 1759 c 24
 Mutiny Act 1759 c 6
 National Debt Act 1759 c 12
 Papists Act 1759 c 13
 Prize, Greenwich Hospital etc. Act 1759 c 19
 Purfleet, Portsmouth, Chatham, Plymouth Fortifications Act 1759 c 11
 Qualification of Members of House of Commons Act 1759 c 20
 Sail Cloth Act 1759 c 17
 Supply Act 1759 c 21
 Supply Act 1759 c 23
 Supply, etc. Act 1759 c 18
 Taxation Act 1759 c 1
 Taxation Act 1759 c 3
 Treason, etc. Act 1759 c 26

See also
List of Acts of the Parliament of Great Britain

References

External links
The Statutes at Large
- Volume 17 - 9 George II to 15 George II - 1735-6 to 1741-2  
- Volume 18 - 15 George II to 20 George II - 1741-2 to 1746-7
- Volume 19 - 20 George II to 23 George II - 1746-7 to 1749-50
- Volume 20 - 23 George II to 26 George II - 1749-50 to 1753 - - also
- Volume 21 - 26 George II to 30 George II - 1753 to 1756-7 - also
- Volume 22 - 30 George II to 32 George II - 1756-7 to 1758-9 - also
- Volume 23 - 33 George II to 1 George III - 1759-60 to 1760-1

1740
1740s in Great Britain
1750s in Great Britain